John Mohring Jr. (born August 31, 1984) is a former professional football linebacker. He was signed as an undrafted free agent by the Tampa Bay Buccaneers in 2007. He played college football for the Georgia Southern Eagles. He was an assistant coach at Arkansas State University. He is currently the Head Coach at Savannah Country Day School in Savannah, Georgia.

Collegiate career
At Georgia Southern, John competed for four years and recorded 302 tackles, tying for fifth all-time in school history. He was honored by being named the Football Coaches Association Division I-AA All American team for the 2006 season.

Professional career
John has participated in mini-camps with the Buffalo Bills and was a member of the 2007 Tampa Bay Buccaneers training camp.

Mohring has also been a member of the Orlando Predators, Grand Rapids Rampage, and Montreal Alouettes.

Family
His father John Sr. played for the Cleveland Browns and Detroit Lions. His cousin Michael Mohring played for the Oakland Raiders and San Diego Chargers.

External links
Montreal Alouettes profile
IFL profile
Iowa Barnstormers Official Site
Iowa Barnstormers Roster
Arena Football League Homepage

1984 births
Living people
Sportspeople from Naples, Florida
American players of Canadian football
American football linebackers
Canadian football linebackers
Georgia Southern Eagles football players
Tampa Bay Buccaneers players
Orlando Predators players
Montreal Alouettes players
Buffalo Bills players
Bloomington Extreme players
Iowa Barnstormers players
Grand Rapids Rampage players